Bruno Miguel Castanheira Gomes (4 February 1977 – 14 September 2014) was a Portuguese cyclist.

Castanheira was born in Barreiro. He died on 14 September 2014 in Torres Vedras from a sudden illness.

Palmares

1999
1st Circuito da Malveira
2000
1st Gran Premio Internacional Mitsubishi MR Cortez
1st stage 1
2002
3rd Volta ao Distrito de Santarém
2003
1st Volta Terras de Santa Maria
3rd National Time Trial Championship
2004
 National Road Champion
2006
3rd Volta Terras de Santa Maria
1st stage 3 
2nd National Time Trial Championship
2009
3rd Vuelta a Extremadura

References

External links
Profile

1977 births
Sportspeople from Barreiro, Portugal
2014 deaths
Portuguese male cyclists
Cyclists at the 2000 Summer Olympics
Olympic cyclists of Portugal